GW4 (also known as GW4 Alliance or Great Western 4) is a consortium of four research intensive universities in South West England and Wales. It was formed in January 2013 by the universities of Bath, Bristol, Cardiff and Exeter to enhance research collaboration. It was launched at the House of Commons in October 2014. In 2014, the group launched a research project into the use of algae to clean up contaminated water at the Wheal Jane tin mine and extract the heavy metals. In 2015 the consortium secured £4.6M from the Medical Research Council for a collaborative PhD training programme in biomedical research.

See also
N8 Research Partnership
Science and Engineering South
M5
Eastern Arc

References

External links

 

College and university associations and consortia in the United Kingdom
University of Bath
University of Bristol
Cardiff University
University of Exeter
2013 establishments in the United Kingdom
Organizations established in 2013